The Ayrshire Royal Horse Artillery was a Territorial Force Royal Horse Artillery battery that was formed in Ayrshire in 1908.  It saw active service during the First World War in the Sinai and Palestine Campaign with the ANZAC Mounted Division from 1916 to 1918.  It was disembodied after the end of the war and was not reconstituted in the post-war Territorial Force.

History

Formation
The Territorial Force (TF) was formed on 1 April 1908 following the enactment of the Territorial and Reserve Forces Act 1907 (7 Edw.7, c.9) which combined and re-organised the old Volunteer Force, the Honourable Artillery Company and the Yeomanry.  On formation, the TF contained 14 infantry divisions and 14 mounted yeomanry brigades.  Each yeomanry brigade included a horse artillery battery and an ammunition column.

On 18 March 1908, Ayrshire Royal Horse Artillery (Territorial Force) was proposed as a new unit and it was recognized by the Army Council on 26 May 1908.  The unit consisted of
Battery HQ at Ayr
Ayrshire Battery at Ayr
Lowland Mounted Brigade Ammunition Column also at Ayr 
The battery was equipped with four Ehrhardt 15-pounder guns and allocated as artillery support to the Lowland Mounted Brigade.

First World War

The battery was embodied with the Lowland Mounted Brigade on 4 August 1914 at the outbreak of the First World War.  The brigade moved to Cupar, Fife on coast defence duties where it remained until September 1915.  In late September 1915, the Lowland Mounted Brigade (without the battery) was dismounted and left Fife for Devonport en route to Gallipoli.  The battery remained in the United Kingdom until February 1916 when it (and its ammunition column) was embarked at Southampton and transported to Alexandria in Egypt.

Service with IV Brigade

IV Brigade, Royal Horse Artillery (T.F.) was formed in April 1916 in the Egyptian Expeditionary Force with the Ayrshire and 
Inverness-shire Batteries, RHA.  It was assigned to the ANZAC Mounted Division to provide artillery support.  In practice, the batteries were permanently attached to the mounted brigades of the division and Ayrshire RHA joined the New Zealand Mounted Rifles Brigade.

The battery served with the ANZAC Mounted Division in the Sinai and Palestine Campaign throughout the rest of the war.  With the division, it saw action at the Battle of Romani (414 August 1916) as part of No. 3 Section, Suez Canal Defences.  This saw the repulse of the final Turkish attempt to cut the Suez Canal.

The division then joined the Desert Column and with it took part in the advance across the Sinai.  It fought at the Battle of Magdhaba (23 December 1916) and the Battle of Rafah (9 January 1917).  The batteries were then re-equipped with four 18 pounders each before taking part in the First (2627 March 1917) and Second Battles of Gaza (1719 April 1917).

Service with XVIII Brigade
In June 1917, the Desert Column was reorganised from two mounted divisions of four brigades each (ANZAC and Imperial Mounted Divisions) to three mounted divisions of three brigades each (ANZAC, AustralianImperial Mounted Division renamedand the new Yeomanry Mounted Division).  Consequently, the British 22nd Mounted Brigade was transferred from the ANZAC to the Yeomanry Mounted Division on 6 July 1917.  With a reduction to three brigades, there was a corresponding reduction in the artillery to three batteries.  The Leicestershire Battery, RHA (T.F.) departed on 20 June to join XX Brigade, RHA (T.F.) in the Yeomanry Mounted Division.

This led to a reorganization of ANZAC Mounted Division's artillery.  A new headquarters, XVIII Brigade, Royal Horse Artillery (T.F.), was formed for the division and took command of Inverness-shire and Ayrshire RHA.  They were joined by Somerset RHA of III Brigade, Royal Horse Artillery (T.F.).  Ayrshire RHA remained attached to the New Zealand Mounted Rifles Brigade.  The batteries were still equipped with 18 pounders when the new brigade was organised but were re-equipped with 13 pounders (four per battery) in time for the Third Battle of Gaza at the end of October 1917.

The brigade, and its batteries, remained with the ANZAC Mounted Division for the rest of the Sinai and Palestine Campaign.  As part of the Desert Mounted Corps, the division took part in the Third Battle of Gaza, in particular the Capture of Beersheba (31 October) and the Battle of Mughar Ridge (13 and 14 November), and the defence of Jerusalem against the Turkish counter-attacks (27 November3 December).

At the beginning of 1918, the division was attached to XX Corps and helped to capture Jericho (1921 February) and then formed part of Shea's Force for the First Trans-Jordan Raid (21 March2 April).  It returned to the Desert Mounted Corps for the Second Trans-Jordan Raid (30 April4 May), the Battle of Abu Tellul (14 July) and the capture of Amman (25 September).

After the Armistice of Mudros, the division was withdrawn to Egypt.  The Australian brigades departed for home in March and April 1919 and the New Zealanders by the end of July.  The brigade was broken up some time after April 1919.

2nd Line
In accordance with the Territorial and Reserve Forces Act 1907 (7 Edw.7, c.9) which brought the Territorial Force into being, the TF was intended to be a home defence force for service during wartime and members could not be compelled to serve outside the country. However, on the outbreak of war on 4 August 1914, many members volunteered for Imperial Service.  Therefore, TF units were split into 1st Line (liable for overseas service) and 2nd Line (home service for those unable or unwilling to serve overseas) units.  2nd Line units performed the home defence role, although in fact most of these were also posted abroad in due course.

Unlike almost all of the other Territorial Force RHA Batteries, the Ayrshire RHA did not form a 2nd line in the First World War.

Post war
The Ayrshire Royal Horse Artillery was not reconstituted in the Territorial Force in 1920.

See also

 List of Territorial Force horse artillery batteries 1908

Notes

References

Bibliography

External links
The Royal Horse Artillery on The Long, Long Trail
The Great War Royal Horse Artillery

Royal Horse Artillery batteries
Artillery units and formations of World War I
Military units and formations established in 1908
Military units and formations disestablished in 1919
Military units and formations in Ayrshire
1908 establishments in Scotland